Ethmia defreinai is a moth in the family Depressariidae. It was described by Julius Ganev in 1984. It is found in Turkey.

References

Moths described in 1984
defreinai